The Open the Twin Gate Championship is a professional wrestling tag team title created and promoted by the Japanese promotion Dragon Gate. Dragon Gate had used the WAR IJ Tag Team Championship since 2006, until 2007 when Masato Yoshino and Naruki Doi introduced the new Twin Gate after winning the Summer Adventure Tag League tournament. They later defeated the IJ champions, Kenichiro Arai and Taku Iwasa, to unify the titles and become the first Twin Gate champions. 

Naruki Doi and Yamato, Cima and Dragon Kid hold the most successful consecutive defenses with nine. Cima and Dragon Kid are also the longest reigning champions, with first reign as a team totaling 397 days. There have been a total of 61 reigns shared between 42 different teams consisting of 41 distinctive champions. The current title holders are Natural Vibes (Kzy and Big Boss Shimizu) who are in their first reign as a team.

Title history

Combined reigns 

{| class="wikitable sortable" style="text-align: center"
!Rank
!Team
!No. ofreigns
!Combineddefenses
!Combined days
|-
!1
| || 1 || 9 || 397
|-
!2
| || 4 || 4 || 299
|-
!3
| || 2 || 9 || 281
|-
!4
| || 3 || 7 || 270
|-
!5
| || 2 || 5 || 268
|-
!rowspan=2|6
| || 2 || 6 || 210
|-
| || 1 || 5 || 210
|-
!8
| || 3 || 5 || 205
|-
!9
|  || 2 || 3 || 203
|-
!10
| || 1 || 1 || 200
|-
!11
| || 1 || 4 || 194
|-
!12
| || 2 || 6 || 187
|-
!13
| || 2 || 3 || 156
|-
!14
| || 1 || 3 || 147
|-
!15
| || 1 || 3 || 144
|-
!16
| || 1 || 3 || 136
|-
!17
| || 2 || 2 || 130
|-
!18
| || 2 || 2 || 128
|-
!19
| || 1 || 3 || 119
|-
!20
|/Z-Brats || 2 || 2 || 114
|-
!21
| || 1 || 3 || 112
|-
!22
| || 1 || 1 || 105
|-
!23
|style="background-color:#FFE6BD"|Natural Vibes † || 1 || 4 || +
|-
!rowspan=2|24
| || 1 || 2 || 104
|-
| || 1 || 2 || 104
|-
!rowspan=2|26
| || 1 || 2 || 87
|-
| || 1 || 0 || 87
|-
!28
|Z-Brats || 1 || 1 || 86
|-
!29
| || 1 || 0 || 84
|-
!30
| || 1 || 1 || 74
|-
!31
| || 3 || 0 || 71
|-
!32
| || 1 || 1 || 65
|-
!33
| || 1 || 1 || 64
|-
!34
| and Takashi Yoshida || 1 || 1 || 59
|-
!35
| || 1 || 1 || 52
|-
!36
| || 1 || 0 ||  51
|-
!37
| and Naruki Doi || 1 || 1 || 48
|-
!38
| || 1 || 0 || 40
|-
!39
|Naruki Doi and Takashi Yoshida || 1 || 0 || 29
|-
!40
| || 1 || 0 || 28
|-
!41
| || 1 || 0 || 18
|-
!42
| || 1 || 0 || 8
|-

By wrestler 
{|class="wikitable sortable" style="text-align: center"
!Rank
!Wrestler
!data-sort-type="number"|No. ofreigns
!data-sort-type="number"|Combineddefenses
!data-sort-type="number"|Combineddays	
|-
!1
|  || 10 || 21 || 936
|-
!2
|  || 7 || 18 || 792
|-
!3
|style="background-color:#FFE6BD"| Big R/Big Boss/King Shimizu † || 6 || 14 || +
|-
!4
|  || 9 || 9 || 671
|-
!5
|  || 5 || 12 || 604
|-
!6
|  || 7 || 12 || 526
|-
!7
|  || 5 || 11 || 467
|-
!8
|  || 5(6) || 7 || 446
|-
!9
|  || 3 || 9 || 433
|-
!10
|  || 3 || 8 || 412
|-
!11
|  || 6(7) || 5 || 411
|-
!12
|  || 5 || 6 || 350
|-
!13
|  || 3 || 7 || 340
|-
!14
|  || 2 || 1 || 287
|-
!15
|  || 3 || 7 || 270
|-
!16
|  || 2 || 5 || 268
|-
!17
|  || 3 || 7 || 246 
|-
!18
|  || 3 || 4 || 232
|-
!19
|  || 2 || 4 || 204
|-
!20
|  || 2 || 3 || 203
|-
!21
|  || 3 || 2 || 198
|-
!22
|  || 2 || 6 || 187
|-
!23
| Dragon Dia || 2 || 4 || 186
|-
!24
|  || 5 || 2 || 184
|-
!25
|  || 2 || 3 || 176
|-
!26
| Jason Lee || 2 || 2 || 155
|-
!27
| Yuki Yoshioka || 1 || 3 || 112
|-
!28
|style="background-color:#FFE6BD"| Kzy † || 1 || 4 || +
|-
!rowspan=2|29
| Kota Minoura || 1 || 2 || 104
|-
|  || 1 || 2 || 104
|-
!rowspan=3|31
|  || 1 || 1 || 87
|-
|  || 1 || 1 || 87
|-
|  || 1 || 0 || 87
|-
!rowspan=2|34
|  || 1 || 1 || 86
|-
| Diamante || 1 || 1 || 86
|-
!36
| Madoka Kikuta || 1 || 1 || 74
|-
!37
|  || 1 || 1 || 64
|-
!38
| Jacky "Funky" Kamei || 1 || 0 || 51
|-
!39
|  || 1 || 0 || 28
|-
!rowspan=2|40
|  || 1 || 0 || 18
|-
| H.Y.O || 1 || 0 || 18
|-

See also
Open the United Gate Championship

References

External links
Open the Twin Gate Championship
   Open the Twin Gate Championship title history at cagematch

Dragon Gate (wrestling) championships
Tag team wrestling championships